The 1993 Philippine Basketball Association (PBA) Governors' Cup was the third and last conference of the 1993 PBA season. It started on September 26 and ended on December 14, 1993. The tournament is an Import-laden format, which requires an import or a pure-foreign player for each team. The tournament features a handicapping rule which allows teams that failed to reach the semifinals for the last two conference to have an import with a 6'6" height limit. The other teams will be allowed with a 6'3" import.

Format
The following format will be observed for the duration of the conference:
The teams were divided into 2 groups. 

Group A:
Purefoods TJ Hotdogs
San Miguel Beermen
Shell Helix Oilers
Sta. Lucia Realtors

Group B:
Alaska Milkmen
Ginebra San Miguel
Pepsi Mega Bottlers
Swift Mighty Meaty Hotdogs

Teams in a group will play against each other twice and against teams in the other group once; 10 games per team; Teams are then seeded by basis on win–loss records. Ties are broken among point differentials of the tied teams. Standings will be determined in one league table; teams do not qualify by basis of groupings.
The top five teams after the eliminations will advance to the semifinals.
Semifinals will be two round robin affairs with the remaining teams. Results from the elimination round will be carried over. A playoff incentive for a finals berth will be given to the team that will win five of their eight semifinal games.
The top two teams (or the top team and the winner of the playoff incentive) will face each other in a best-of-seven championship series. The next two teams will play for the best-of-five series for third place.

Elimination round

Team standings

Semifinals

Team standings

Cumulative standings

Semifinal round standings:

San Miguel qualified for the finals outright after topping the semifinals; Sta. Lucia won five semifinal games to earn themselves a playoff for the other finals berth. However, Swift and Pepsi were tied for the #2 seed. This meant that Sta. Lucia's opponent for the finals berth playoff has to be determined first. The losers of the two playoff games will play for third place.

Second seed playoff

Finals berth playoff

Third place playoffs

Finals

References

External links
 PBA.ph

Governors' Cup
PBA Governors' Cup